Dysideidae is a family of sea sponges in the order Dictyoceratida.

Genera
Citronia Cook & Bergquist, 2002
Dysidea Johnston, 1842
Euryspongia Row, 1911
Lamellodysidea Cook & Bergquist, 2002
Pleraplysilla Topsent, 1905

References

Dictyoceratida
Sponge families